José María Balbino Venancio Samper Agudelo (31 March 1828 — 22 July 1888) was a Colombian lawyer, politician, and writer. In his writing he covered many genres including poetry, drama, comedy, novels, didactic works, biographies, travel books, and critical and historical essays. He collaborated in different periodicals of his time, was founder of La Revista Americana, and worked as managing editor of El Deber, and editor-in-chief of El Comercio.

Personal life
José María Balbino Venacio was born on 31 March 1828 to José María Samper Blanco and Tomasa Agudelo y Tafur, in Honda, present-day Tolima. Among his siblings, two stand out: Agripina, who was married to Manuel Ancízar Basterra, and his older brother Miguel, a businessman and politician, and great-grandfather of Ernesto Samper Pizano. He married Elvira Levi Espina in 1851, but she died soon after in 1852 leaving no children. On 5 May 1855 he married Soledad Acosta Kemble, a renowned writer and journalist, and together they had four daughters, Bertilda, who become a nun, and took up poetry like her parents, Carolina (b. 1857) and María Josefa (b. 1860), both of whom died in 1872 during a smallpox outbreak in Bogotá, and Blanca Leonor (b. 1862).

Selected works

References

External links
 
 

1828 births
1888 deaths
People from Honda, Tolima
Jose Maria
Saint Thomas Aquinas University alumni
19th-century Colombian lawyers
19th-century Colombian historians
Colombian journalists
Male journalists
Colombian travel writers
Colombian political writers
Burials at Central Cemetery of Bogotá
19th-century travel writers
19th-century journalists
19th-century male writers